Tamara Heggen (born in 1976) is an Australian former competitive figure skater who won three Australian national titles in the early 1990s. She competed at three World Championships, reaching the free skate in 1992 (Oakland, California), and three World Junior Championships. She represented New South Wales through the 1990–1991 season and then Queensland. After retiring from competition, she remained in Queensland.

Competitive highlights

References 

1976 births
Australian female single skaters
Living people
Sportswomen from Queensland